Port Coquitlam is a city in British Columbia, Canada. Coquitlam borders it on the north, the Coquitlam River borders it on the west, and the city of Pitt Meadows lies across the Pitt River from it. Port Coquitlam is bisected by Lougheed Highway and the Canadian Pacific Railway. Port Coquitlam is often referred to as "PoCo". It is Canada's 93rd-largest municipality by population.

History

The area was long inhabited by indigenous peoples, most recently by the historic Coast Salish people, including the Kwikwetl'em. The first European settlers began farming beside the Pitt River in 1859. A major impetus to the creation of a municipality was when the Canadian Pacific Railway moved its freight terminus from Vancouver to "Westminster Junction", building a spur line to the Fraser River port of New Westminster in 1911. Port Coquitlam was first incorporated as a municipality on March 7, 1913.

Port Coquitlam was originally developed mostly as farmland. Given the expansion and increasing density of Vancouver, it has now been developed for suburban housing, especially in the northern and southwestern areas of the city. The economy is diversified, with a variety of industrial and commercial developments, including metal fabrication, high technology industries, and transportation.

Transportation
Being primarily suburban, Port Coquitlam relies heavily on its vehicular roads to move people and goods. For example, two of its major arterial roads, Shaughnessy Street and Lougheed Highway bisect Port Coquitlam north to south and east to west, respectively.

TransLink provides a number of bus routes throughout the city. The most used bus routes in this section of the Metro Vancouver Regional District are the 159, which connects southern Port Coquitlam to SkyTrain at Braid station. Other bus routes in the city include the 160, which links Port Coquitlam with Vancouver via Coquitlam Central Station and Moody Centre station, and the 173/174, which runs a loop through the northern half of the city, linking it with regional buses at Coquitlam Central and Port Coquitlam station. Two major stops in the city include Port Coquitlam Centre and Port Coquitlam Station. The remainder of Port Coquitlam is served by a network of Community Shuttles.

Port Coquitlam is the only one of the Tri-Cities to not have SkyTrain. However, this may change in the future with a Millennium Line extension into the downtown area. When the Evergreen Extension was built, the first few metres of track and a track switch to allow for an eventual eastward extension to Port Coquitlam were built at Coquitlam Central station. This would create two branches where trains would alternate between going north to Lafarge Lake–Douglas or east to downtown Port Coquitlam. A feasibility study was conducted, started during early 2020 and running for about six months. Both Mayor Brad West, the Port Coquitlam City Council, and the Coquitlam City Council have voiced support for the extension. However, as of 2022, no funding had been secured nor a formal plan created.

The Lougheed Highway passes through Port Coquitlam, running from Coquitlam in the west to the Pitt River Bridge in the east. Although this highway has made much of Port Coquitlam a very congested area, it is one of the few major arterial highways in the area.

The Mary Hill Bypass, officially known as Highway 7B, runs adjacent to the Fraser River from the Pitt River Bridge on the east to the Port Mann Bridge on the west.

The Canadian Pacific Railway has a major rail yard in the central sector of the city.

In October 2009, the new Pitt River Bridge, a new seven-lane cable-stayed bridge, opened to the public replacing the existing crossing.  The previous crossing was made up of 2 swing bridges, which were removed upon completion of the new bridge. The Pitt River Bridge crosses the Pitt River, connecting Port Coquitlam to neighbouring Pitt Meadows.

In March 2010, the Coast Meridian Overpass, a new four-lane cable-stayed bridge, opened to give a new option for traveling north to south over the Canadian Pacific Railway Oxford Street rail yard.

A  hiking and biking trail, known as the Traboulay PoCo Trail, completely surrounds the city.

In August 2018, U-bicycle launched a dockless bicycle sharing system in the city.

Demographics

During the second half of the 1990s, the population grew at a rate of 9.8%, spurred by numerous immigrants. By 2001 they comprised 25% of the population. English was the first language for 76% of the inhabitants.

In 2009, Port Coquitlam was rated 85th for its murder rate (for Canadian cities with a population over 50K).

Ethnicity 

Note: Totals greater than 100% due to multiple origin responses.

Languages 
The 2021 census found that English was spoken as mother tongue by 62.4% of the population. Chinese languages made up the next largest first language category. Chinese languages were the mother tongues of 8.2% of residents, including 4.5% Cantonese and 3.4% Mandarin. Other common first languages were Persian (3.0%), Korean (2.6%), and Tagalog (2.4%). As a single response, French was the first language of 0.9% of the population. 3.5% of residents listed both English and a non-official language as mother tongues, while 0.4% listed both English and French.

Religion 
According to the 2021 census, religious groups in Port Coquitlam include:
Irreligion (29,825 persons or 49.4%)
Christianity (23,980 persons or 39.7%)
Islam (2,590 persons or 4.3%)
Sikhism (1,335 persons or 2.2%)
Buddhism (855 persons or 1.4%)
Hinduism (755 persons or 1.3%)
Judaism (300 persons or 0.5%)
Indigenous Spirituality (45 persons or 0.1%)

Education

Public schools 
Public schools in Port Coquitlam are part of School District 43 Coquitlam and consists of several private schools as well.

Secondary schools:
 Riverside Secondary
 Terry Fox Secondary

Middle schools:
 Citadel Middle
 Kwayhquitlum Middle
 Maple Creek Middle (former Hastings Junior Secondary)
 Minnekhada Middle (former George Pearkes Junior Secondary)
 Pitt River Middle (former Mary Hill Junior Secondary)

Elementary schools:
 Birchland Elementary
 Blakeburn Elementary
 Castle Park Elementary
 Cedar Drive Elementary
 Central Elementary
 Coquitlam River Elementary
 Glen Elementary (French Immersion)
 Irvine Elementary (French Immersion)
 James Park Elementary
 Hazel Trembath Elementary
 Kilmer Elementary (French Immersion)
 Lincoln Elementary (Closed in 2007).
 Mary Hill Elementary (French Immersion)
 Westwood Elementary

The Conseil scolaire francophone de la Colombie-Britannique operates one Francophone primary and secondary school: école des Pionniers-de-Maillardville.

Private schools 
 Archbishop Carney Regional Secondary School
 Our Lady of the Assumption Elementary
 British Columbia Christian Academy (formerly Lincoln Elementary)
 Hope Lutheran Christian School
 Ecole des Pionniers de Maillardville (French)
 Sprott Shaw College (post secondary)

Notable residents
 Rene Tosoni, Former Major League Baseball Player Minnesota Twins
 Sukh Chungh, Canadian football player
 Zach Hamill, professional hockey player, drafted 8th overall in the 2007 NHL Entry Draft by the Boston Bruins
 Betty Fox, cancer research activist, mother of Terry Fox
 Terry Fox, athlete and cancer treatment activist
 Robert Pickton, convicted serial killer, alleged to be Canada's most prolific
 Ian Tracey, Leo and Gemini Award-winning actor
 Amanda Todd, bullying victim
 Tyler Shaw, singer and songwriter

See also

 Province of British Columbia
 Metro Vancouver Regional District
 School District 43 Coquitlam
 Tri-Cities (British Columbia)

Notes

References
Specific
Francis, Daniel, ed. Encyclopedia of British Columbia, Harbour Publishing Ltd, 2000

General

External links

 
1913 establishments in British Columbia
Cities in British Columbia
Populated places established in 1913
Populated places in Greater Vancouver